Jacques Géry (12 March 1917, Paris – 15 June 2007, Sarlat, France) was a French ichthyologist. He was also a scientist and a Doctor of Medicine.

The most notable species he described are:
 Green neon tetra, Paracheirodon simulans (Géry, 1963)
 Black neon tetra, Hyphessobrycon herbertaxelrodi (Géry, 1961)
 Royal tetra, Inpaichthys kerri (Géry & Junk, 1977)
 Rummy-nose tetra, Hemigrammus bleheri (Géry & Mahnert, 1986)
 Red phantom tetra, Hyphessobrycon sweglesi (Géry, 1961)
 Brittanichthys axelrodi  (Géry, 1965)
 Brittanichthys myersi (Géry, 1965)

See also
:Category:Taxa named by Jacques Géry

References 
 Jacques Géry: Characoids of the world. T.F.H. Publications, Neptune City, .

External links 
 
 Jacques Géry at aquapress-bleher.com

1917 births
2007 deaths
French ichthyologists
Scientists from Paris
20th-century French zoologists